United States of China is a political concept first devised in the early 1920s by Chen Jiongming of a  federalized China modeled closely after the United States of America. Given the political, social and linguistic realities of China in the warlord period, Chen Jiongming believed that a federalist approach was the only feasible way to eventually establish a united, democratic republic.  Beginning with Guangdong as a model state, he wanted to organize a "United States of China in the manner of the American experience" through negotiation with federalists from all parts of the country.

The introduction of Special Economic Zones since the 1980s have led to the development of several distinct regional economies within the People's Republic of China, such as the Pearl River Delta, Yangtze River Delta, and the  Bohai Circle. Several of these regions have economies the size of small developed nations. Some scholars who use the term United States of China argue that during the process of Chinese economic reform the People's Republic has evolved into a de facto federal state in which these economic regions have wide discretion to implement policy goals which are set by the PRC central government and in which provinces and localities actively compete with each other in order to advance economically.

See also
Federal Republic of China
New Federal State of China

References

External links
 Allen T. Cheng "The United States of China: How business is moving Taipei and Beijing together" - Asiaweek, July 6, 2001
Davis, Michael C. "The Case for Chinese Federalism"
Chen Jiongming and the Federalist Movement
Weingast, Barry R. "Federalism, Chinese Style: The Political Basis for Economic Success in China".pdf version
Democracy and Its Limits in Greater China

Constitutional law
Politics of China
Federalism in China
Proposed countries